Zaleptiolus is a genus of harvestmen in the family Sclerosomatidae from Asia.

Species
 Zaleptiolus ater J. Martens, 1987
 Zaleptiolus aureolus Suzuki, 1970
 Zaleptiolus implicatus Suzuki, 1970
 Zaleptiolus laevipes Roewer, 1955

References

Harvestmen
Harvestman genera